The 2002 Men's Hockey Champions Trophy was the 24th edition of the Hockey Champions Trophy men's field hockey tournament. It took place at the Kölner Stadtwald in Cologne, Germany. The event was held from August 31 – September 8, 2002.

Netherlands won the tournament by defeating Germany in the final.


Squads

Head Coach: Barry Dancer

Head Coach: Bernhard Peters

Head Coach: Rajinder Singh

Head Coach: Joost Bellaart

Head Coach: Tahir Zaman

Head Coach: Kim Young-Kyu

Results
All times are Central European Summer Time (UTC+02:00)

Preliminary round

Pool

Classification

Fifth and sixth place

Third and fourth place

Final

Final standings

Awards

References

External links
Official FIH website

C
F
2002
Champions Trophy (field hockey)